Herbedan (also Romanized as Herbedān and Harbedan; also known as Hermadūn) is a village in Nasrovan Rural District, in the Central District of Darab County, Fars Province, Iran. At the 2006 census, its population was 1,123, in 249 families.

References 

Populated places in Darab County